Sunni Vahoras or Sunni Bohras (also Jafari Bohras or Patani Bohras), are a community from the state of Gujarat in India. Sharing many cultural similarities with the Dawoodi Bohras, they are often confused with that community. The community in Pakistan uses the surname "Vohra" and not Bohra and are commonly known as Sunni Vohras. A few families use the slightly different spelling of "Vora" or "Vohra" as their surname. Another common surname is Patel. 

Charotar Vohra is also a different caste they all live in the charotar region Gujarat and Nadiyadi Vohra is a sub cast of charotar Vohra and they live in Nadiad. 

An overwhelming majority of the Gujarati-speaking Vohra community of Pakistan lives in the port city of Karachi in Sindh province. They are well organized and carry out their activities through their own Karachi-based association named Charotar Muslim Anjuman, Charotar being the name of the region in the Indian state of Gujarat where their ancestors are originally from.

History and distribution
In the 15th century, there was a schism in the Bohra community of Patan, Gujarat as many converted from Mustaali Ismaili to Sunni Islam. The leader of this conversion movement to Sunni Islam was Jafar Patani, himself a Bohra convert to Sunni Islam. Thus this new group is known as Jafari Bohras and Patani Bohras. In 1538, Syed Jafar Ahmad Shirazi, a missionary from Sindh, convinced Patani Bohras to cease social relations with Ismaili Bohras. This resulted in a  conversion of around 80%, Shia 
Ismaili faith to Sunni Islam. This however was changed by Maulaya Raj, who went on to explain how highly misguided people are and explained Islam to them and invited them, hence leading to the return of most of these people back to their faith.

See also
 Gujarati Muslims
 Vora Patel

References

Bohra
Social groups of Pakistan
Muhajir communities
Muslim communities of Gujarat
Sunni Islam in India